The 1977 Segunda División de Chile was the 26th season of the Segunda División de Chile.

Coquimbo Unido was the tournament's champion.

Table

See also
Chilean football league system

References

External links
 RSSSF 1977

Segunda División de Chile (1952–1995) seasons
Primera B
Chil